Francisco Lage Pereira de Nóbrega (born 14 April 1942) is a former Portuguese footballer who played as forward. He played for F.C. Porto from 1963 to 1968 and had 4 international appearances.

External links 
 
 

1942 births
Living people
Portuguese footballers
Association football forwards
Primeira Liga players
FC Porto players
Portugal international footballers